The 1987 FIBA Club World Cup took place at PalaTrussardi, Milan. It was the 21st edition of the FIBA Intercontinental Cup for men's basketball clubs. It was the fourth edition of the competition that was held under the name of FIBA Club World Cup. From the FIBA European Champions Cup participated Tracer Milano, Maccabi Elite, Cibona, Žalgiris, and FC Barcelona. From the South American Club Championship participated Monte Líbano, and Ferro Carril Oeste. Representing the Division I (NCAA) was the State of Washington NCAA All-Stars Team.

Participants

Group stage

Group A 

Day 1, September 15 1987

|}

Day 2, September 16 1987

|}

Day 3, September 17 1987

|}

Day 4, September 18 1987

|}

Group B 

Day 1, September 15 1987

|}

Day 2, September 16 1987

|}

Day 3, September 17 1987

|}

Day 4, September 18 1987

|}

Places 5-8

7th place game 
September 19 1987

|}

5th place game 
September 20 1987

|}

Places 1-4

Semi finals 
September 19 1987

|}

3rd place game 
September 20 1987

|}

Final

Final standings

MVP (Best Player Award)

  Juan Antonio San Epifanio ("Epi") - ( FC Barcelona)

References

External links
1987 World Cup for Champion Clubs 

 

1987
1987 in Italian sport
September 1987 sports events in Europe
International basketball competitions hosted by Italy
1987–88 in South American basketball
1987–88 in American basketball
1987–88 in European basketball